Gloria Asumnu (born 22 May 1985) is a Nigerian sprinter.  As she was born in the United States, she previously represented them in international competitions, before switching to represent Nigeria.  She changed nationality in 2011, on her second application, the first having been denied by the IAAF.

She was born in Houston, Texas, ran for Alief Elsik High School and Tulane University.

Achievements

References

External links
 
 Maputo 2011: Nigeria Grabs Sprint Relay, Hurdles Gold, this day life, 2011-09-14.

1985 births
Living people
Nigerian female sprinters
Athletes (track and field) at the 2012 Summer Olympics
Athletes (track and field) at the 2016 Summer Olympics
Olympic athletes of Nigeria
Athletes (track and field) at the 2014 Commonwealth Games
World Athletics Championships athletes for Nigeria
Commonwealth Games silver medallists for Nigeria
Commonwealth Games medallists in athletics
African Games gold medalists for Nigeria
African Games medalists in athletics (track and field)
African Games bronze medalists for Nigeria
Athletes (track and field) at the 2011 All-Africa Games
Olympic female sprinters
21st-century Nigerian women
Medallists at the 2014 Commonwealth Games